John Francis Hodgess Roper, Baron Roper PC (10 September 1935 – 29 January 2016) was a British Liberal Democrat politician.

Early life
Roper was educated at William Hulme's Grammar School (Manchester), Reading School, Magdalen College, Oxford (studying Philosophy, Politics and Economics (PPE) and the University of Chicago. He began his career as an economics lecturer at the University of Manchester.

Political career

Roper first stood for Parliament for High Peak as a Labour candidate at the 1964 general election, but the Conservative David Walder retained the marginal seat. He was elected Member of Parliament for Farnworth at the 1970 general election. In 1972 he acted as an unofficial whip for pro-European Labour MPs to help pass the Heath government's European Communities Act.

He sat as a Labour Co-operative MP (1970–81) and for the Social Democratic Party (SDP) from 1981 to 1983, when he was also the party's Chief Whip. His Farnworth seat was subsequently abolished, and he contested Worsley (which contained parts of the abolished Farnworth constituency) in the 1983 general election, finishing third in a three-way marginal.

House of Lords
On 12 May 2000, he was created a Life peer as Baron Roper, of Thorney Island in the City of Westminster. He was the Liberal Democrat Chief Whip in the House of Lords until 2005. He was subsequently appointed to the Privy Council of the United Kingdom. In 2008, he was elected Principal Deputy Chairman of Committees. He retired from the House of Lords on 23 May 2015.

Allegations

Stasi allegations
Roper was wrongfully accused by author Anthony Glees of having been a Stasi "agent of some influence" during his time at Chatham House.

Roper rejected the charges and said that he was engaged in building bridges with East Germany in the 1980s as part of a Foreign Office-approved policy of thawing relations. "He was deceived, he says, about the background of an undercover Stasi officer he employed as a research fellow when he was director of studies at Chatham House".

Personal life
Roper was married to Hope Edwards from 1959 until her death in 2003. She was the daughter of John Edwards, a former Health and Treasury Minister under Clement Attlee. They had one daughter, Kate Stewart Roper (originally Kate Roper). He also had 3 grandchildren.

References

External links
 
Lord Roper profile, libdems.org.uk 
Who's Who 2002 entry

1935 births
2016 deaths
British economists
Labour Co-operative MPs for English constituencies
Alumni of Magdalen College, Oxford
Liberal Democrats (UK) life peers
Members of the Privy Council of the United Kingdom
People educated at Reading School
Social Democratic Party (UK) MPs for English constituencies
UK MPs 1970–1974
UK MPs 1974
UK MPs 1974–1979
UK MPs 1979–1983
Council and directors of Chatham House
Treasurers of the Fabian Society
Life peers created by Elizabeth II